Roan may refer to:

Animals
Roan (color), a type of animal coat color that shows intermixed white and darker-colored hairs
Roan (horse), a horse coat color pattern
Varnish roan, a leopard-complex horse coat color that looks similar to roan
Roan antelope, an African savanna antelope
Roan Allen (1904–1930), one of the founding sires of the Tennessee Walking Horse

People
Roan (name), a personal name and surname
Charles H. Roan (1923—1944), a United States Marine
Dan Roan (born 1976), a sports editor for BBC News
John Roan, a landowner in Greenwich, London who left his estate for the founding of the John Roan School
John Roan (bishop) (died 1692), a Church of Ireland Bishop of Killaloe
Michael Roan (born 1972), a former professional American football tight end
Oscar Roan (born 1951), a former American football tight end
Roan Carneiro, a Brazilian professional mixed martial artist
Roan Ching-yueh (born 1958), a Taiwanese architect, writer, curator and an Associate Professor of Department of Art Creativity

Places

Iran
Roan, Iran, a village in Hamadan Province

Norway
Roan, Norway, a municipality in the Fosen district of Trøndelag
Roan, a village in Roan municipality in Trøndelag
Roan Church, a church in Roan municipality in Trøndelag

United Kingdom
Old Roan, an area in Aintree village, Merseyside, England
Old Roan railway station, a railway station in Aintree village, Merseyside, England
Old Roan Chase, a steeplechase in Aintree village, Merseyside, England
Roan, County Tyrone, a townland in County Tyrone, Northern Ireland

United States
Roan Cliffs, a range of mountains and cliffs in Utah and Colorado
Roan Creek, a tributary of the Watauga River in Tennessee
Roan Creek (Colorado), a tributary of the Colorado River in Garfield County, Colorado
Roan Mountain (Roan Highlands), a mountain on the Tennessee-North Carolina border
Roan Mountain, Tennessee, a census-designated place (CDP) in Carter County, Tennessee
Roan Mountain State Park, located in East Tennessee along the Tennessee-North Carolina border
Roan Plateau, a plateau that overlooks the Colorado River Valley

Zambia
Roan (Zambian National Assembly constituency), a parliamentary constituency
Roan, Luanshya, a suburb of Luanshya in the Roan constituency

Other
Battle of Roan's Tan Yard, an action during the American Civil War
The John Roan School, a comprehensive secondary school in Blackheath, South-East London
The Secret of Roan Inish, an independent film directed by John Sayles, released widely in 1994
USS Charles H. Roan (DD-853) (1946–1973), a Gearing-class destroyer of the United States Navy
The Strawberry Roan (song), a classic American cowboy song, written by California cowboy Curley Fletcher
Strawberry Roan (1945 film), a 1945 British drama film directed by Maurice Elvey 
Roan United F.C., a Zambian football club based in Luanshya
A valley that curves upward

See also
 Old Roan (disambiguation)
 Roane, a surname
 Roanne, a commune in France
 Rohan (disambiguation)